Aurigids  is a meteor shower occurring  primarily within September.

The comet Kiess (C/1911 N1) is the source of the material that causes the meteors. The comet's orbital period is stated as  approximately 1800 to 2000 years, with showers observed in the years 1935, '86,  '94 and 2007 .

α & δ
The Alpha were discovered by C. Hoffmeister and A. Teichgraeber, during the night of 31 August 1935.

See also
 Carl Clarence Kiess
 Delta Aurigids
 List of meteor showers

References

Sources
 aurigid.seti 16:35 11.10.11

External links
 C Hoffmeister:Meteorstrome-Meteoric-currents-WorldCat 17.41 11:10:11

images
 AMES research centre-colour image1
  AMES research centre-colour image2

Chart
  Aurigidcount AMES research centre 16:35  11.10.11

Meteor showers
September events